Euenkrates is a genus of earwigs in the family Chelisochidae.

Species
The genus includes the following species:

 Euenkrates boesemani Steinmann, 1981
 Euenkrates elegans (De Bormans, 1900) [Srivastava 1976]
 Euenkrates simplex Ramamurthi, 1967
 Euenkrates variegatum Kirby, 1891 [Rehn 1927]

References

External links

 Euenkrates at dermaptera.speciesfile.org
 Chelisochidae at bug.tamu.edu

Chelisochidae
Dermaptera genera